The Vorderman's pipistrelle (Hypsugo vordermanni) is a species of vesper bat found in Brunei Darussalam, Indonesia, and Malaysia. It was described in 1890 by the Dutch zoologist Fredericus Anna Jentink, who named it after its discoverer, the Dutch physician Adolphe Vorderman.

Distribution, Habitat, and Ecology
The species is found on Banggi Island and Belitung Island. In Borneo, it has been reported in Tanjung Puting National Park, Sungai Sarawak Kiri, and Brunei. It may only roost in coastal mangroves.

Conservation status
The IUCN has categorised the species as "Data Deficient" because the species is only known from a few records and localities, and its habitat preferences, population status, threats and ecology are not known. If it is restricted to mangroves, mangrove harvesting and coastal development are major threats to the species.

References

Pipistrellus
Bats of Southeast Asia
Bats of Indonesia
Bats of Malaysia
Mammals described in 1890
Taxa named by Fredericus Anna Jentink